Deyan Sudjic  (born 6 September 1952) is a British writer and broadcaster, specialising in the fields of design and architecture. He was formerly the director of the Design Museum, London.

Life and career
Sudjic grew up in Acton, London; his parents, who were immigrants from Yugoslavia, spoke Serbo-Croatian at home. His parents "lived the high life" after the Second World War, his father, Misa, working as foreign correspondent for Tanjug, the Yugoslav state news agency, then for a time, in less comfortable circumstances, as a bulletin-writer for the BBC World Service, also "working away sporadically on ill-fated plans to make a fortune" including selling non-stick frying pans, holiday lets, and DIY. He was later employed by a travel company taking tourists to Yugoslavia, then relocated to Sveti Stefan, working at a hotel on the Adriatic Sea until he was hospitalized for alcoholism; brought back to the UK by his family, he finally worked as a security guard in a Kirkcaldy shopping centre. Sudjic's mother, Seja, took jobs teaching, translating Serbo-Croat, and in the homeware department at Harrods.

Sudjic was educated at Latymer Upper School, at the time a Direct Grant Grammar School, based in Hammersmith in West London. He attended the University of Edinburgh.

In 1970, as a teen, he contributed to Schoolkids OZ, the subject of an obscenity trial the following year.

Sudjic was the design and architecture critic for The Observer, the Dean of the Faculty of Art, Design and Architecture at Kingston University, visiting professor at the Royal College of Art, and co-chair of the Urban Age Advisory Board.

In 1983, he co-founded, with Peter Murray and Simon Esterson, Blueprint, a monthly architecture magazine and went on to be the magazine's editor and then its editorial director. From 2000–04, he was the editor of Domus. In 2000, he was made OBE.

He was the director of Glasgow's UK City of Architecture and Design program in 1999, and the director of the Venice Architecture Biennale in 2002. Sudjic became director of the Design Museum in 2006.

In 2012, Sudjic was awarded an honorary degree from the University for the Creative Arts.

Sudjic has contributed to The Guardian, the London Review of Books, and other publications.

Selected publications

References

External links
Studio Banana TV interview Deyan Sudjic (March 2011)
Deyan Sudjic on modernism
Book Review by Amanda Levete (Future Systems)

1952 births
Living people
Alumni of the University of Edinburgh
British architecture writers
British curators
British male journalists
Directors of museums in the United Kingdom
Officers of the Order of the British Empire
People educated at Latymer Upper School
The Guardian journalists
Writers from London
British people of Serbian descent